Dr Helen S. King was a South African oncologist and anti-apartheid campaigner.  She was married to Edward King, former Dean of Cape Town. She was awarded the Order of Simon of Cyrene in 1996.

King died in 2015.

Selected works
King co-authored a number of papers in the field of radiotherapy including:

References 

 

South African medical researchers
2015 deaths
South African women scientists
20th-century women scientists
Year of birth missing
People from Cape Town